Střezimíř is a municipality and village in Benešov District in the Central Bohemian Region of the Czech Republic. It has about 300 inhabitants.

Administrative parts
Villages of Bonkovice, Černotice, Dolní Dobřejov and Horní Dobřejov are administrative parts of Střezimíř.

References

Villages in Benešov District